Webster may refer to:

People
Webster (surname), including a list of people with the surname
Webster (given name), including a list of people with the given name

Places

Canada
Webster, Alberta
Webster's Falls, Hamilton, Ontario

United States
Webster, California, in Yolo County
Webster, San Diego, California, a neighborhood
Webster, Florida
Webster, Illinois
Webster, Indiana
Webster, Iowa, in Keokuk County
Webster, Madison County, Iowa
Webster City, Iowa, in Hamilton County
Webster, Kentucky
Webster Parish, Louisiana
Sabattus, Maine, formally Webster, Maine
Webster Plantation, Maine
Webster, Massachusetts, a New England town
Webster (CDP), Massachusetts, the main village in the town
Webster, Michigan, an unincorporated community
Webster, Minnesota
Webster, Nebraska
Webster, New Hampshire
Webster, New York, a town
Webster (village), New York, in the town of Webster
Webster, North Carolina
Webster, North Dakota
Webster, Ohio, in Darke County
Webster, Putnam County, Ohio, a ghost town
Webster, South Dakota
Webster, Texas
Webster, Virginia
Webster, West Virginia
Webster, Burnett County, Wisconsin, a village
Webster, Vernon County, Wisconsin, a town
Webster Avenue, The Bronx, New York
Webster City, Iowa
Webster County (disambiguation)
Webster Groves, Missouri
Webster Pass (Colorado)
Webster Reservoir, Kansas
Webster Springs, West Virginia
Webster Theater, Hartford, Connecticut
Webster Township (disambiguation)
Mount Webster in the White Mountains of New Hampshire

Antarctica
Webster Glacier
Webster Knob, Queen Maud Mountains
Webster Peaks (Prince Charles Mountains)

Education
Webster College, Pasco County, Florida, acquired by Rasmussen College
Daniel Webster College, a defunct college in Nashua, New Hampshire
Webster Graduate School, London
Webster Grammar School, Auburn, Maine
Webster High School (Tulsa, Oklahoma)
Webster Leiden, a university with multiple campuses
Webster University, a liberal arts university in Webster Groves, Missouri, with satellite campuses worldwide

Other
Webster (TV series), a television sitcom starring Emmanuel Lewis
Webster Bank, a bank based in Waterbury, Connecticut
Webster Bank Arena, a previous name of the Total Mortgage Arena in Bridgeport, Connecticut
Webster's Brewery, a former brewer in Yorkshire, England
Webster's Dictionary, any of several dictionaries edited by Noah Webster
Webster Hotel, New York City
Webster Limited, Australian business
Webster ruling, test case in association football law
Webster v. Reproductive Health Services, 492 U.S. 490 (1989)
The Webster, luxury multi-brand fashion house
Webster & Sheffield, a law firm in New York City
A specific martial arts trick and related variants
Webster/Sainte-Laguë method, a method of producing proportional representation

See also